German submarine U-155 was a Type IXC U-boat of Nazi Germany's Kriegsmarine built for service during World War II. Her keel was laid down on 1 October 1940 by DeSchiMAG AG Weser in Bremen as yard number 997. She was launched on 12 May 1941 and commissioned on 23 August with Kapitänleutnant Adolf Piening in command. Piening was relieved in February 1944 (after being promoted to Korvettenkapitän), by Oberleutnant zur See Johannes Rudolph.

Design
German Type IXC submarines were slightly larger than the original Type IXBs. U-155 had a displacement of  when at the surface and  while submerged. She had two shafts and two  propellers.

U-155 was fitted with six  torpedo tubes (four fitted at the bow and two at the stern), 22 torpedoes, one  SK C/32 naval gun, 180 rounds, and a  SK C/30 as well as a  C/30 anti-aircraft gun. The boat had a complement of forty-eight.

Service history
Leutnant zur See Ludwig von Friedeburg relieved Rudolph from August to November 1944, when Rudolph resumed command for another month. During these four months, U-155 had the youngest U-boat commander during the war since Von Friedeburg was only 20 years old. In December, Kptlt. Erwin Witte took over, and was relieved in April 1945 by Oblt.z.S. Friedrich Altmeier. Altmeier commanded the boat for one month before the German surrender; she was then scuttled by the Royal Navy. The wreck was located, largely intact, in 2001.

She was a member of one wolfpack. She sank a warship and a troop transport ship, and damaged a cargo ship, with one salvo of four torpedoes on 15 November 1942 during her fourth patrol, and shot down a P-51 Mustang aircraft on her final patrol.

First patrol

U-155 left Kiel on her first patrol on 7 February 1942. Her route took her 'up' the North Sea, through the gap between the Faroe and Shetland Islands and into the Atlantic. South of Cape Farewell in Greenland, she sank  and Adellen on the 22nd.

On the tenth, the First Watch Officer (1WO) Oberleutnant zur See Gert Rentrop was washed overboard.

The boat docked at the Lorient U-boat base on the Atlantic coast of German-occupied France on March 27.

Second patrol

Having left Lorient on 24 April 1942, U-155 steamed to the eastern Caribbean Sea and that portion of the Atlantic adjacent to it. She attacked Brabant southwest of Grenada on 14 May. The ship sank in eight minutes.

The U-boat sank another six ships; one of them, Sylvan Arrow, was torpedoed on 20 May, but did not go down until the 28th, following a salvage attempt.

The submarine returned to Lorient on 14 June.

Third patrol

U-155s third and most successful foray was conducted in similar waters to her second effort, beginning in Lorient on 9 July. She sank Barbacena with torpedoes east of Barbados, but others, such as Piave, went to the bottom with the more economic deck gun. Another victim, Cranford, met her end within three minutes. Part of her cargo was 6,600 tons of chrome ore. Two injured survivors were treated on U-155 before water, supplies and directions were handed over to their colleagues.

The submarine's skipper apologized for sinking one ship (Empire Arnold on 4 August), to the Chief Officer, who told him it was a bad business and wished it [the war] was over. Piening replied: "So do I".

Maschinengefreiter Konrad Garneier was lost overboard during an air attack on 19 August.

In all, the boat sank ten ships, a total of 43,514 GRT.

Fourth patrol

Three of a spread of four torpedoes hit targets, one aal (eel: U-boat slang for torpedo), damaged , a US Navy-requisitioned cargo transport; two others sank escort carrier  and the British troop transport Ettrick on 15 November 1942 northwest of Gibraltar. Of 526 men on Avenger, there were 12 survivors. Ettricks master was awarded the Order of the British Empire (OBE).

The boat also sank Serroskerk in mid-Atlantic. There were no survivors.

Fifth patrol

U-155s fifth sortie involved her move to the western Caribbean and southern Florida, USA.

On the return journey U-155 was attacked by an unknown aircraft on 27 April northwest of Cape Finisterre, Spain.

Sixth patrol

The formation was attacked by four de Havilland Mosquito aircraft on 14 June — three from No. 307 Polish Night Fighter Squadron and one from No. 410 Squadron RCAF. One Mosquito, hit in the port engine, was forced to break off its attack and return to base where it made a belly landing. Five men in the boat's crew were wounded; they were treated by U-68s doctor on their return to Lorient on 16 June.

Seventh and eighth patrols

Patrol number seven was as long as any of the others, to a point northeast of the Cape Verde Islands; but the boat did not find any targets.

The submarine's eighth patrol took her toward the northeast coast of Brazil. While sinking Siranger she took the third mate prisoner (he had been wounded, and was operated-on by the boat's doctor). He was taken back to Lorient and was eventually transferred to the POW camp at Milag Nord near Bremen.

Ninth and tenth patrols

U-155s ninth patrol was, at 105 days, her longest, but like her seventh, found no targets. On 4 May 1944, the boat shot down a North American P-51 Mustang aircraft of No. 126 Squadron RAF and on 23 June 1944, Mosquitos of 248 Squadron attacked, killing Matrosenobergefreiter Karl Lohmeier and Mechanikerobergefreiter Friedrich Feller and wounding seven others. Her patrol terminated at Lorient the same day.

Her tenth and final patrol left Lorient on 9 September 1944, the last by a U-boat from the base. The patrol was uneventful; she returned to Germany by a circuitous route, and docked at Flensburg on 21 October.

Fate
On 22 June 1945, after the German surrender, she was transferred from Wilhelmshaven to Loch Ryan, Scotland for Royal Navy Operation Deadlight, the scuttling of surrendered German U-boats, and sunk on 21 December the same year.

Post war

Her crew held their 25th reunion in 1995 with former Oberleutnant zur See Johannes Rudolph and one of the Mosquito pilots who attacked the boat in June 1944 'on board'.

Summary of raiding history

See also
 List of Operation Deadlight U-boats

References

Notes

Citations

Bibliography

External links

German Type IX submarines
U-boats commissioned in 1941
Operation Deadlight
World War II submarines of Germany
1941 ships
Ships built in Bremen (state)
U-boats scuttled in 1945
Maritime incidents in December 1945